Allured may refer to:

Allured (archdeacon of Barnstaple)
Allured Business Media, an American print media company
Allured Mines, a mine that operated in the Ivanpah Mountains, California, US
Malcolm Allured (born 1945), British musician; former member of Showaddywaddy

See also
Allure (disambiguation)
Alured (disambiguation)